One Love, One Rhythm – The 2014 FIFA World Cup Official Album is a compilation album that was released on May 8, 2014 by Sony Music Entertainment. This album is the official music album of the 2014 FIFA World Cup in Brazil. It features songs written and selected for the 2014 FIFA World Cup in Brazil.

Information
One Love, One Rhythm features work by well-known Brazilian singers, including Arlindo Cruz, performer of "Tatu Bom de Bola", the official mascot song, Sergio Mendes, Bebel Gilberto, and SuperSong finalist Rodrigo Alexey, featuring Preta Gil. Contributions from artists of other nationalities include original songs by 1960s American doo-wop group The Isley Brothers, Norwegian-Spanish pop singer Adelén, Canadian reggae-pop band Magic! and Bahamian Pop/Junkanoo Band Baha Men.

Remixes of the official song and the mascot song by Afro-Brazilian Carnival bloc Olodum and DJ Memê, respectively, are featured as bonus tracks on the deluxe edition of the album. "Fighter", a Japanese track performed by Mika Nakashima and Miliyah Kato, was released as a single in Japan on June 4, 2014. Also featured is "Lepo Lepo", a song by pagode group Psirico which was considered the theme song of the 2014 Brazilian Carnival.

Singles
The first single from One Love, One Rhythm is "We Are One (Ole Ola)", a collaboration between American artists Pitbull and Jennifer Lopez and Brazilian axé singer Claudia Leitte. It was released on April 8, 2014 and served as the tournament's official theme song. The second single was "Vida", a bilingual English and Spanish song recorded by Ricky Martin as a result of SuperSong, an online music contest held by Sony Corporation. The song was released on April 22, 2014. Voters chose "Vida" by American singer-songwriter Elijah King as their favorite song.

Third single "Dar um Jeito (We Will Find a Way)", performed by Carlos Santana and Wyclef Jean featuring Avicii and Alexandre Pires, served as the World Cup's official anthem. It was released on April 29, 2014. Fourth single, "Olé", performed by Adelén, was released on May 12, 2014. "La La La (Brazil 2014)" was officially sent to radio stations in Italy on May 27, 2014 as the fifth overall single from the album.

Track listing

Charts

Weekly charts

Year-end charts

See also
 List of FIFA World Cup songs and anthems

References

2014 FIFA World Cup
2014 compilation albums
FIFA World Cup albums
Albums produced by RedOne
Albums produced by Dr. Luke
RCA Records compilation albums
Sony Music compilation albums